The Robinson Observatory is an astronomical observatory owned and operated by the University of Central Florida College of Sciences in Orlando, Florida, USA.

Public viewings are held the first and third Wednesday of each month and are sponsored by the Central Florida Astronomical Society (CFAS).

History 
The observatory was built at a cost of over $500,000 in 1995, with Herbert Robinson donating almost half of the total cost. The observatory was given the name Robinson posthumously, eight months after Herbert Robinson's death, on April 25, 1996.

In the 2000s, a number of updates and renovations were completed at the observatory.  The most recent addition was in 2007; it included high speed internet, a new  Ritchey-Chrétien telescope, and the ability to remotely operate the telescope and dome.

Future 
Plans are under way to expand the Robinson Observatory to include two smaller telescopes with domes donated by the United States Air Force.

See also 
List of astronomical observatories
University of Central Florida
College of Sciences

References

External links
 University of Central Florida
 UCF Department of Physics
 Robinson Observatory Clear Sky Clock

University of Central Florida
Astronomical observatories in Florida
Buildings and structures in Orlando, Florida
Tourist attractions in Orlando, Florida
1995 establishments in Florida